Pierre Wolper is a Belgian computer scientist at the University of Liège. His research interests include verification methods for reactive and concurrent programs, as well as temporal databases. He is the co-recipient of the 2000 Gödel Prize, along with Moshe Y. Vardi, for his work on temporal logic with finite automata. He also received the 2005 Paris Kanellakis Award for this work.

Following elections of October 2018, he becomes Rector of the University of Liège.

References

External links

Website at the University of Liège

Year of birth missing (living people)
Living people
Belgian computer scientists
Stanford University alumni
Gödel Prize laureates